Narsahi  is a village development committee in Nawalparasi District in the Lumbini Zone of southern Nepal. At the time of the 1991 Nepal census it covered a population of 4639 people living in 768 individual households.

References

Populated places in Parasi District